The 2010 Aragon motorcycle Grand Prix was the thirteenth round of the 2010 Grand Prix motorcycle racing season. It took place on the weekend of 17–19 September 2010 at the Motorland Aragón circuit. It was the first running of the event.

MotoGP classification

Moto2 classification

125cc classification
Randy Krummenacher was black flagged for crashing on the first lap and taking down Marc Márquez in the process. The race stewards deemed the accident intentional and subsequently disqualified him.

Championship standings after the race (MotoGP)
Below are the standings for the top five riders and constructors after round thirteen has concluded.

Riders' Championship standings

Constructors' Championship standings

 Note: Only the top five positions are included for both sets of standings.

References

Aragon motorcycle Grand Prix
Aragon
Aragon